Thakur Vidya Mandir High School is a secondary, co-educational school in Kandivali, Mumbai, India.

Thakur Vidya Mandir is Co-ed school was founded in 1990  by Shri Thakur Ramnarayan Singh and Shri Thakur Shyamnarayan Singh. It is affiliated to the Maharashtra State Secondary and Higher Secondary Education Board. The school is managed by the Thakur Educational Trust.

It is located at Thakur Complex in suburb of Kandivali. It has 7000 students. The current principal of TVM is Anuradha Kamath and Vice-Principal is Shailesh  Singh. Incharge Trustee is Rajkumar Singh Ji.

References

External links
 

Schools in Mumbai